Ferencvárosi TC is a Hungarian professional football club based in Ferencváros, Budapest. Ferencváros has been the most successful Hungarian club in European football competitions having won the 1964–65 Inter-Cities Fairs Cup.

Ferencváros became the first Hungarian club to enter the group stages of the UEFA Champions League in the 1995–96 season.

Matches
Ferencváros score listed first.

UEFA-organised seasonal competitions

European Cup and Champions League

European Cup Winners' Cup

UEFA Cup and Europa League

UEFA Intertoto Cup

UEFA-non organised seasonal competitions

Inter-Cities Fairs Cup

Challenge Cup

Mitropa Cup 

Notes
Note 1:(playoff 2–1)
Note 2:(playoff 2–0)
Note 3:(playoff 3–0)
Note 4:(playoff 2–1)

Club record in UEFA competitions
As correct of 18 September 2020

Biggest home win: 8 September 1965, Ferencváros 9–1  Keflavík
Biggest home defeat: 27 September 1995, Ferencváros 1–5  Ajax and 13 August 2019, Ferencváros 0–4  Dinamo Zagreb
Biggest away win: 29 July 1998,  Principat 1–8 Ferencváros
Biggest away defeat: 20 October 1994,  Porto 6–0 Ferencváros
Appearances in UEFA Champions League:  14
Appearances in UEFA Cup Winners' Cup:  8
Appearances in UEFA Europa League:  21
Appearances in Inter-Cities Fairs Cup: 5
Appearances in UEFA Intertoto Cup:  2
Appearances in Mitropa Cup:  15
Appearances in Challenge Cup:  4
Player with most UEFA appearances: 54  Dénes Dibusz
Top scorers in UEFA club competitions: 17  Péter Lipcsei

Overall record

Competitions record 
As of 8 December 2020

Source: UEFA.comPld = Matches played; W = Matches won; D = Matches drawn; L = Matches lost; GF = Goals for; GA = Goals against; GD = Goal Difference. 

Correct as of 8 December 2020

By country and club

Key

Notes

UEFA club ranking

Last updated: 27 August 2022 
Season 2022-23 in progress 
Source: Club coefficients at

References

External links

Ferencvárosi TC
Hungarian football clubs in international competitions